The Brighton Belles is a short-lived British sitcom, based on the hit American sitcom The Golden Girls. The programme consisted of 11 episodes, which were broadcast from 1993 until 1994, being pulled halfway through its run due to very poor ratings.

Cast
Sheila Hancock as Frances
Wendy Craig as Annie
Sheila Gish as Bridget
Jean Boht as Josephine

Reception 
Brighton Belles was a commercial and critical failure, being mauled by critics. The BBC Comedy Guide said of the series' failure: 'Why did it fail? Several explanations apply, but the simplest has to be that The Golden Girls itself was already familiar to most British television watchers [...], and people felt no reason to tune-in to a UK adaptation delivering the same lines. When an original piece is already nigh-on perfect, and has sated its public, why try to sell a replica? Most transatlantic sitcom adaptations air without the original series having been seen in that territory. To pitch to viewers a carbon copy of an already successful series, seems pointless - in hindsight, at least.'

Brighton Belles performed so poorly in the ratings that it was pulled from the ITV schedule just six episodes into its run. The remaining episodes aired more than a year later in a filler slot, and were not screened by all ITV regions. When asked about the series in an interview from 2007, Sheila Hancock commented that '...It should have worked, the four of us are all old comedy hands and the initial scripts showed potential for growth. But Carlton [who produced the series] simply didn't know how to produce comedy, they just wanted something cheap and easy to fill a half hour slot.' Meanwhile, Wendy Craig - talking in previous interview, from 2003 - said '...On hindsight, it probably wasn't wise [attempting the series]. The Golden Girls was so globally popular and renowned that there's no way that a clone of it could do anything but pale in comparison.'

See also 

 List of sitcoms known for negative reception

References

External links
IMDb Profile

The Golden Girls
1993 British television series debuts
1994 British television series endings
1990s British sitcoms
British television series based on American television series
ITV sitcoms
Carlton Television
Television series by ITV Studios
Television shows set in Brighton
English-language television shows
Television series by ABC Studios